Seckbach may refer to:

Seckbach (Frankfurt am Main), a district or Stadtteil of Frankfurt am Main, Germany

People with the surname
Elie Seckbach, sports writer

German-language surnames